Gaoual (N’ko: ߜ߭ߥߊߟ) is a town located in northwestern Guinea, near the border of Guinea-Bissau. It is the capital of Gaoual Prefecture. As of 2014 it had a population of 20,582 people.

Etymology
The name "Gaoual" comes from the Fula word "gaawol", meaning ditch.

People from Gaoual
 Ousmane  Gaoual Diallo (1968-), politician
 Alfa Yaya Diallo, national hero and king of Labé
 Diallo Cravate, businessman
 Tiana Diallo, former minister
 El hadj Amadou Binani Diallo, former minister of Energy
 Kandioura Dramé, former minister of Health
 Alpha Ibrahima Mongo Diallo, former minister of Communication
 Bouna Sarr, footballer on Bayern Munich
 Yoriken, rapper, member of the group Methodik

References

Sub-prefectures of the Boké Region